The Wainwright Tomb is a mausoleum located in Bellefontaine Cemetery in St. Louis, Missouri. Originally constructed for Charlotte Dickson Wainwright in 1892, the tomb also contains the remains of her husband, Ellis Wainwright. The mausoleum was designed by noted Chicago school architect Louis Sullivan, who also designed the Wainwright Building for Ellis Wainwright.

History
Shortly after the construction of the Wainwright Building in Downtown St. Louis (itself now a National Historic Landmark), the "young and beautiful" wife of wealthy St. Louis brewery owner Ellis Wainwright died. Wainwright commissioned Louis Sullivan to design a tomb for his wife and himself, which was completed in 1892. In 1901, Wainwright fled the United States after being indicted for bribery, but he later returned and died in St. Louis in 1924, then was entombed with his wife. After his death, an endowment was established that provided for the reconstruction or renovation of the tomb in case of earthquake or vandalism. The tomb was listed on the National Register of Historic Places on June 15, 1970 and became a St. Louis Landmark in 1971.

Architecture and significance
The tomb is a domed cubic building with walls of concrete covered in limestone on the exterior. On the northeast (front) side of the tomb is the entrance with a double-leafed bronze grill and double-doors. The sides of the tomb each have windows, also covered in bronze grills. The limestone walls are carved with floral patterns that do not repeat. The interior of the tomb has two burial slabs and a mosaic floor and ceiling. The Wainwright Tomb has significance as a work of Louis Sullivan, and it has been described as "the most sensitive and the most graceful of Sullivan's tombs" and as "one of Sullivan's masterpieces."

See also
Getty Tomb
Ryerson Tomb

Notes

References

External links

Architectural detail drawings of the Wainwright Tomb
Bellefontaine Cemetery Wainwright Tomb site
Photographs of restored mosaics in the tomb

Buildings and structures completed in 1892
Landmarks of St. Louis
Monuments and memorials on the National Register of Historic Places in Missouri
National Register of Historic Places in St. Louis
Cubic buildings
Buildings and structures in St. Louis
Tourist attractions in St. Louis
Art Nouveau architecture in Missouri
Art Nouveau sculptures and memorials
1892 establishments in Missouri
Chicago school architecture in Missouri
Mausoleums on the National Register of Historic Places
Death in Missouri